The Blue Trees is the seventh album by Welsh band Gorky's Zygotic Mynci, released on 30 October 2000.

Track listing
"The Blue Trees"
"This Summer's Been Good from the Start'"
"Lady Fair"
"Foot and Mouth '68"
"Wrong Turnings"
"Fresher Than the Sweetness in Water" (Honeybus cover)
"Face Like Summer"
"Sbia Ar y Seren"

References

External links

The Blue Trees at YouTube (streamed copy where licensed)

2000 albums
Gorky's Zygotic Mynci albums
Albums produced by Gorwel Owen